Nandjélé is a village in northeastern Ivory Coast. It is in the sub-prefecture of Foumbolo, Dabakala Department, Hambol Region, Vallée du Bandama District.

Until 2012, Nandjélé was in the commune of Nandjélé-Ségbéré. In March 2012, Nandjélé-Ségbéré became one of 1126 communes nationwide that were abolished.

Notes

Populated places in Vallée du Bandama District
Populated places in Hambol